Madder is the common name for Rubia, a genus of flowering plants in the family Rubiaceae.

Madder may also refer to:

People 

Leo Madder (born 1946), Belgian television actor

Places 

 Madder Cliffs, Antarctica

Music 

 Madder Mortem, Norwegian progressive metal band
 Madder Lake, Australian progressive rock band
 Madder Rose, New York City-based alternative rock band

Other 

 Even Madder Aunt Maud, character in Philip Ardagh's books 'The Eddie Dickens Trilogy'
 Rose madder, red dye or paint made from the pigment Madder Lake, traditionally extracted from the crushed root of Rubia tinctorum

See also
 Maddur (disambiguation)
 Mader (disambiguation)